WSVI, virtual channel 8 (UHF digital channel 20), is an Ion Television-affiliated station serving the United States Virgin Islands that is licensed to Christiansted, Saint Croix. The station is owned by Atlas News and Information Services, as part of a duopoly with Charlotte Amalie-licensed independent station WZVI (channel 21). The two stations share studios at the Sunny Isle Shopping Center in Christiansted; WSVI's transmitter is located on Blue Mountain.

WSVI operates a digital translator in Charlotte Amalie, WFIG-LD (VHF channel 5, also mapped to virtual channel 8 via PSIP), with transmitter atop Flag Hill. WSVI serves as the flagship station of the Virgin Islands Television Network.

History
WSVI signed on as an ABC affiliate on November 10, 1965. During its ABC affiliation, WSVI signed off nightly at 2 a.m. AST (1 a.m. AST March to November), but the station now carries a 24-hour schedule. During non-network programming time, WSVI carried paid programming, Caribbean Lottery drawings, some local arts and events programming, and their weeknight-only local newscasts, as the U.S. Virgin Islands receives other broadcast networks and superstations from the mainland United States via cable and satellite. The need for WSVI to maintain a full broadcast schedule of syndicated programming outside of network hours for island residents and tourists was thus negated, since the aforementioned stations usually contain that syndicated programming in their schedules.

The station has had multiple ownership changes. Antilles Broadcasting Corp. sold WSVI to Group III Inc. for $4 million in late 1986. In April 2011, WSVI's former owner, the Figgie Family Equity Fund, agreed to sell the station to Atlas News and Information Services of Las Vegas, Nevada, pending FCC approval.

On January 1, 2016, WSVI became an affiliate of Ion Television after 50 years of being an ABC affiliate; it consequently became one of the few stations to have switched their affiliation from a Big Three-affiliated network to a minor television network. WSVI told the Virgin Islands Daily News that it had declined to renew its contract with ABC at the beginning of 2016, although other local reports indicated that ABC was threatening to remove its programming due to the station's low ratings and technical issues. ABC then entered into an agreement with Lilly Broadcasting, which feeds CBS affiliate WSEE-TV in Erie, Pennsylvania to pay television vendors in the Caribbean with local weather inserts, to also provide its programming to the region, via WENY-TV in Elmira, New York. ABC also stated to the Daily News that its programming would be seen on WCVI-TV, which claimed not to have knowledge of any arrangement at the time. WCVI-TV began broadcasting WENY-TV's ABC feed on its second digital subchannel in 2016, and for three years, no full-powered TV station based in the U.S. Virgin Islands had a primary affiliation with any of the "Big Four" networks until November 20, 2019, when the aforementioned WCVI-TV began carrying CBS on its .1 channel.

WSVI and WZVI's terrestrial signals have been off the air since Hurricane Maria struck the Virgin Islands on September 20, 2017. The Telecommunications Act of 1996 requires the stations' licenses be deleted after one year of continuous silence, although WSVI has applied for an extension through a hardship waiver granted by the FCC to Caribbean stations affected by Maria and Hurricane Irma.

Digital television

Digital channels
The station's digital signal is multiplexed:

Note: WSVI-DT5 carries an independent feed of religious programming known under the umbrella branding of "TheWord.tv". It holds no relation or affiliation with the mainland's The Word Network.

Analog-to-digital conversion
WSVI shut down its analog signal, over VHF channel 8, on June 12, 2009, the official date in which full-power television stations in the United States transitioned from analog to digital broadcasts under federal mandate. The station's digital signal remained on its pre-transition UHF channel 20. Through the use of PSIP, digital television receivers display the station's virtual channel as its former VHF analog channel 8.

References

External links

Ion Television affiliates
SVI
Television channels and stations established in 1965
1965 establishments in the United States Virgin Islands